The 1991–92 BHL season was the tenth season of the British Hockey League, the top level of ice hockey in Great Britain. 10 teams participated in the league, and the Durham Wasps won the league title by finishing first in the regular season. They also won the playoff championship.

Regular season

Playoffs

Group A

Group B

Semifinals
Nottingham Panthers 7-3 Peterborough Pirates
Durham Wasps 11-4 Whitley Warriors

Final
Durham Wasps 7-6 Nottingham Panthers

References

External links
Season on hockeyarchives.info

1
United
British Hockey League seasons